Wendy Greene Bricmont is an American film editor known for her work on films like Annie Hall, My Girl, Kindergarten Cop, Slumber Party Massacre, and Mean Girls. She's an alumna of Oberlin College.

Selected filmography 
 The High Note (2020)
 Set It Up (2018)
 The Duff (2015)
 Fun Size (2012)
Mad Money (2008)
 I Think I Love My Wife (2007)
 Herbie: Fully Loaded (2005)
 Mean Girls (2004)
 The Sweetest Thing (2002)
 Six Days Seven Nights (1998)
 Father's Day (1997)
 The Rich Man's Wife (1996)
 Race the Sun (1996)
 Junior (1994)
 My Girl 2 (1994)
 Calendar Girl (1993)
 My Girl (1991)
 Kindergarten Cop (1990)
 License to Drive (1988)
 Love Letters (1984)
 Slumber Party Massacre (1982)
 Annie Hall (1977)

References

External links

Living people
American film editors
American women film editors
Oberlin College alumni
Year of birth missing (living people)
21st-century American women